Operation Tunisia refers to the actions by internet group Anonymous during the Tunisian revolution.

Activities
Anonymous began DDoS attacks and multiple government websites in Tunisia were soon taken offline as a result of the attacks. Additionally, Anonymous provided protesters with documents required to take down the incumbent government as well as distributing a care package, among other things, including Tor, and a greasemonkey script to avoid proxy interception by the government. The providing of information was considered by some a part of Operation Leakspin. They also aided in passing information about the protests in and out of the country.

Some Anonymous members in the #OpTunisia channel were Tunisians, one of them called 'slim404', whose real name was Slim Amamou, a Tunisian blogger. He aided in passing software between Anonymous and protestors. Amamou was arrested on Jan. 6, 2011. He was later released from jail and went on to become the secretary of state for sport and youth, he resigned in May to protest the transitional government's censorship of the web.

See also
 Tunisian Revolution
 Arab Spring

References

External links
 https://www.anonymoustunisie.com/ Website of Anonymous TN

Tunisia
Internet vigilantism
2011 in Tunisia
Tunisian Revolution
Anonymous (hacker group)